This is a list of seasons played by Sporting de Huelva, a Spanish women's football club, since its creation in 2004.

Summary

References

Spanish football club seasons
Women's football club seasons
Association football lists by Spanish club